Harris Khalique (born 20 October 1966) is a Pakistani poet in Urdu, English and Punjabi and a civil society activist. Khalique has authored ten collections of poetry and two books of non-fiction. In March 2018, he  received the Presidential Pride of Performance Award from the state of Pakistan as an acknowledgement of his contributions to poetry. 
In 2013, he was awarded the UBL Literary Excellence Award in the category of Urdu poetry for his collection Melay Mein. He is also a University of Iowa Honorary Fellow in Writing. During the 1980s and 1990s, some of his poems faced censorship in Pakistan. Anthologised and published internationally, he is translated into several languages and his poetry is composed to music and dance.

Career
Harris Khalique has managed and advised organisations, development projects and human rights campaigns in Pakistan, South Asia and Europe. He has worked with the Aga Khan Foundation, Amnesty International and United Nations agencies. Since March 2019, he is the Secretary-General of the Human Rights Commission of Pakistan. He has published papers and spoken at national and international conferences on history, culture, politics and issues surrounding human rights and international development. He has written for Dawn, The News International, The New York Times, The Hindu, The Friday Times and Deutsche Welles (English).

Literary accomplishments
In 2015, he participated in the International Writing Program's Fall Residency at the University of Iowa in Iowa City, United States.

He gave the keynote speeches at the 12th International Urdu Conference in December 2019, at the 11th Karachi Literature Festival in March 2020, at the 8th Faisalabad Literary Festival in November 2021  and at the 7th Ayaz Melo in December 2021.

Critical appreciation

Leading academic scholar, language historian and author Dr. Tariq Rahman writes, “…Harris Khalique is a major Pakistani poet in English. He uses condensed imagery and laconic, simple and highly evocative words to convey his meaning.”  Literary critic, linguist and scholar Fateh Mohammad Malik says, “Harris Khalique stands out amongst his generation of poets. He is the true progressive voice of our times who inspires us to stand for the poor and weak, not by sloganeering in verse but by using aesthetically powerful and contemporary poetic idiom". Poet and essayist Omar Perez (Son of Ernesto Che Guevara) writes, “Harris Khalique explores with self contained mastery, the contrasts between official and untold history." Distinguished scholar-in-residence, St Michael’s College, Vermont, Kristin Dykstra  writes, “ His [Khalique's] meditations refract violence, each abstracting human need from a detailed portrait of sorrow.”  Speaking of his Urdu poems, poet Zehra Nigah said, “Khalique’s poetry has image-making, wonderment, history and characterisation. It is difficult to include all these elements in a nazm (poem).”  Author, critic and professor of Urdu literature, Dr Nasir Abbas Nayyar writes, “Khalique’s poems afford a central place to those things, people and occurrences whose existence is either erased, or pushed to the margins, or put in constant danger by the forces of the bazaar.”

Poetry collections
 Hairaa'n Sar-i-Bazaar (Urdu, 2021). 
 No Fortunes to Tell (English, 2019). 
 Melay Mein (Urdu, 2012). 
 Ishq Ki Taqveem Mein (Urdu, 2006). 
 Between you and your love (English, 2004, Revised and Expanded, 2012)
 Purani Numaish (Urdu, 2001)
  Saray Kaam Zaroori Thay (Urdu, 1997). 
 Divan (English, 1998)
 If wishes were horses (English, 1996)
 Aaj Jab Hui Baarish (Urdu, 1991)

Essay collection
 Crimson Papers: Reflections on Struggle, Suffering and Creativity in Pakistan (English, 2017).

Co-edited volume of essays
 Pakistan: Here and Now (English, 2021).

Creative non-fiction
 Unfinished Histories (co-written, English, 2002).

Monographs
 The Latent Transformation: Challenges, Resilience and Successes of Pakistani Women  (2011)
 Pakistan Mein Syasi Tabdeeli Ki Simt  (Co-written, Urdu, 2007)
 Pakistan: The Question of Identity  (2003)

Anthologies where work appeared
 Windows on the World – 50 writers, 50 views. Penguin US, 2014. 
 Look at the city from here. Oxford University Press, 2010. 
 Pakistani Urdu Verse. Oxford University Press, 2010. 
 Language for a New Century. W.W. Norton and Co., 2008. 
 The Poetry of Men’s Lives, The University of Georgia Press. 2004. 
 Dragonfly in the Sun – 50 years of Pakistani writing in English. Oxford University Press, 1997. 
 Best Asian Poetry 2021-2022, Kitaab, 2022. 
 Azadi Magro'n Punjabi Nazm, Pakistan Punjabi Adabi Board, 2011.

Personal life
He was born in Karachi, Sindh, Pakistan. He lived and worked in Europe before moving to Islamabad, Pakistan. Khalique's paternal ancestors were Kashmiris who had converted to Islam and settled in Lucknow, Awadh. His maternal ancestors were from Amritsar, Punjab.

References

External links
 Harris Khalique at the Poetry Foundation

1966 births
Living people
English-language poets from Pakistan
International Writing Program alumni
Muhajir people
NED University of Engineering & Technology alumni
Pakistani civil rights activists
Pakistani columnists
Pakistani essayists
Pakistani people of Kashmiri descent
Punjabi people
Poets from Karachi
Recipients of the Pride of Performance
Urdu-language poets from Pakistan
Writers from Islamabad